Tenth planet is a term formerly applied to possible planets beyond Neptune, before the reclassification of Pluto. It may also refer to:

Astronomy
 2060 Chiron, claimed by some to be the tenth planet upon discovery
 15760 Albion, then nicknamed "Smiley" and hailed as the tenth planet
 Eris (dwarf planet), referred to by some to be the tenth planet after discovery, up to the reclassification of Pluto

Other uses
 10th Planet Jiu-Jitsu, non-traditional system of Brazilian Jiu-Jitsu
 The Tenth Planet, the Doctor Who serial
 The Tenth Planet, a 1984 novel by Leo Melamed
 The Tenth Planet, a 1952 Hollywood Star Playhouse radio play starring Joseph Cotten
 "Tenth Planet", a song by Solid Space from the 1982 album Space Museum

See also
 Planet X (disambiguation)
 Ninth planet (disambiguation)
 Eleventh planet
 Fictional planets of the Solar System